Vattakudi Ukkadai, also known as Vattakudi South is a village in Tamil Nadu, India. It is located in the Madukur block of Thanjavur district.

Demographics 

According to the 2011 census of India, the Vattakudi South village has a population of 1353. This includes 680 males and 673 females. The effective (6 years and above) literacy rate of village is 75.63%.

Geography 

Vattakudi South is 12 km from the city of Pattukkottai. The coast of the Bay of Bengal is just 12km away, with Manora fort 15km away from this village. Due to its geographical position, Vattakudi South experiences hot and humid climate and there is no extreme variation in seasonal temperature. As it is nearer to the equator, the summer season starts from April and extends till early June. This period observes the hottest part of the year, locally known as "Agni Nakshatram" or "Khatri".

Nearby villages include Vattakudi North, Kasankadu, Athivetti, and Pichinikkadu.

Economy 

Most of the residents are involved in agriculture and dependent activities. The agriculture in the village relies on water from the Kaveri River for irrigation. Paddy and coconut are the major crops in the village.

Administration 

The village is administered by a gram panchayat. It comes under the Pattukkottai assembly constituency and the Thanjavur parliamentary constituency. The current MLA is N. R. Rengarajan of TMC (M), and the current MP is K. Parasuraman of AIADMK. The current panchayat President is K. Amarajothi Kanadasamy.

Culture 
The temples in the village include Sri Magha Muthumariamman temple, Shri Minnadiyar temple, Shri Vinayagar temple, and Shri Ayyanar temple. Sri Balathandayudhabani temple is located near Vattakudi South.

The famous festivals are: 
 Pongal festival (4 days) celebrated in January
 The fourth day of the Pongal festival Sports events for Adults & children in Vattakudi South organized by village adults.
 Tamil Varuda Pirapu celebrated in April
 Sri Magha Muthumariamman temple Thiruvizha (8 days) celebrated in June (Vaikasi Visakam)
 The 7th day of Thiruvizha (Visagam) event is Kavadi 
 The 8th day of the festival event is Swami Therottam.
 Vinayagar Chathurthi celebrated in September
 Ayutha Poojai celebrated in October
 Deepavali & Thiru Karthigai celebrated in November

References 

Villages in Thanjavur district